Sonny Opara is a Nigerian former footballer. He was once CEO of Akwuegbu United F.C. in his native country.

Orlando Pirates

Known for wearing a sweatband embossed with the word 'CHIKA', Opara made 18 league starts and scored 5 goals in all competitions during his first season there, leaving the club after Shuaibu Amodu was replaced by Viktor Bondarenko.

References

Year of birth missing (living people)
Living people
Nigerian footballers
Nigerian expatriate footballers
Orlando Pirates F.C. players
Expatriate soccer players in South Africa
Association football forwards